First Myanmar Investment (also abbreviated FMI) is a major Myanmar investment company founded in 1992 as one of Myanmar's first publicly traded companies. It is a subsidiary of Serge Pun & Associates. The company's headquarters are located in Pabedan Township, Yangon.

Real estate contributes to 87% of FMI's revenue. FMI owns 3 major properties in Yangon, namely FMI City, Star City, and FMI Center.

Subsidiaries
Yoma Bank

References

External links
 

Financial services companies of Myanmar
Financial services companies established in 1992
1992 establishments in Myanmar